is the 16th single of duo Pink Lady, released on December 5, 1979. The song was originally chosen to be the theme song for the Japanese teams at the 1980 Summer Olympics in Moscow, but Japan became one of 66 countries to boycott the games following the Soviet invasion of Afghanistan, thus affecting the song's sales. This was the duo's first single not to reach the top 20 in Japan.

The song sold 300,000 copies.

A re-recorded version of the song was included on the 2-disc greatest hits release, INNOVATION, released in December 2010.

Track listing (7" vinyl)

Chart positions

Cover versions
 The tribute group Pink Babies covered "Itoshi no New Orleans" in their "UFO" Type-C single in 2017.

References

External links
 
 

1979 singles
1979 songs
Pink Lady (band) songs
Japanese-language songs
Disco songs
Olympic theme songs
Songs with music by Shunichi Tokura
Victor Entertainment singles